The Polish Socialist Party – Revolutionary Faction (PPS–FR) also known as the Old Faction was one of two factions into which the Polish Socialist Party split in 1906. The Revolutionary Faction's primary goal was to restore an independent Poland, which was envisioned as a representative democracy. 

Its opposition was the Polish Socialist Party – the Left (also known as PPS–L or the Young Faction), which believed that Poland should be a socialist country, established through proletarian revolution, and likely a part of some larger international communist country. 

With the failure of revolution in the Kingdom of Poland (1905-1907) PPS–L lost popularity, and PPS–FR regained dominance. In 1909 PPS–FR renamed itself back to Polska Partia Socjalistyczna (Polish Socialist Party); the increasingly marginal PPS–L merged with Social Democracy of the Kingdom of Poland and Lithuania in 1918 to form the Communist Party of Poland. PPS in the meantime supported militarist pro-independence activities of Combat Organization of the Polish Socialist Party and Związek Walki Czynnej.

The PPS–FR organized several raids and assassinations of Tsarist officials in the Russian partition, most prominent the Bezdany raid.
The leader of the party, Józef Piłsudski would later create the Polish Legions with many of the PPS–FR activists and contribute greatly to the regaining of independence.

In independent Poland, in 1928, the PPS split once more. While the PPS had supported Piłsudski during the May Coup in 1926, they disagreed afterward whether to support his Sanation movement. When the PPS decided to go into opposition, a faction of Piłsudski's supporters in the PPS split off and created the Polish Socialist Party – old Revolutionary Faction.

Activists of the PPS–FR (Revolutionary Faction) included Józef Piłsudski, Kazimierz Pużak, Tomasz Arciszewski, Rajmund Jaworowski, Leon Wasilewski, Mieczysław Niedziałkowski, Walery Sławek, Norbert Barlicki, and Jędrzej Moraczewski.

See also
Polish legions in WWI

References

1906 establishments in the Russian Empire
1909 establishments in the Russian Empire
Defunct socialist parties in Poland
National liberation movements
Political parties disestablished in 1909
Political parties established in 1906
Polish Socialist Party
Political parties of the Russian Revolution